No More Ladies was a 1934 Broadway three-act comedy written by A. E. Thomas, produced by Lee Shubert, and staged by Harry Wagstaff Gribble with scenic design created by Watson Barratt. It ran for 162 performances from January 23, 1934 to June 1934 at the Booth Theatre. The play was included in Burns Mantle's The Best Plays of 1933-1934. It was adapted into the 1935 film No More Ladies directed by Edward H. Griffith and starring Joan Crawford,
Robert Montgomery and Franchot Tone.

Cast
 Edward Fielding as Mr. Anderson Townsend	
 Mary Sargent as Mrs. Anderson Townsend	
 Lucile Watson as Mrs. Fanny Townsend	
 Ruth Weston as Marcia Townsend
 Melvyn Douglas as Sheridan Warren	
 Miriam Battista as Jacquette
 Rex O'Malley as James Salston	
 John Bramall as Dickens	
 Bradley Cass as Oliver Allen	
 Boyd Davis as Stafford	
 Louis Hector as Earl of Moulton	
 Nancy Ryan as Diana	
 Marcella Swanson as Teresa German

References

External links 
 

1934 plays
Broadway plays
Plays set in New York City
Plays set in New York (state)
American plays adapted into films